Estemmenosuchus (meaning "crowned crocodile" in Greek) is an extinct genus of large, early omnivorous therapsid. It is believed and interpreted to have lived during the middle part of the Middle Permian around 267 million years ago. The two species, E. uralensis and E. mirabilis, are characterised by distinctive horn-like structures, which were probably used for intra-specific display. Both species of Estemmenosuchus are from the Perm (or Cis-Urals) region of Russia. Two other estemmenosuchids, Anoplosuchus and Zopherosuchus, are now considered females of the species E. uralensis. There were many complete and incomplete skeletons found together.

Description

The animal had a sprawling posture as indicated by analysing its shoulder joints.

The skull superficially resembles that of Styracocephalus, but the "horns" are formed from different bones; in Estemmenosuchus the horns are located on the frontals and protrude upward, whereas in Styracocephalus the horns are formed by the tabular and extend aft.

Species

Estemmenosuchus is interpreted to have lived some 267 million years ago. Two species have been identified, from the Ocher Assemblage Zone Belebei Formation at the Ezhovo locality near Ochyor in the Perm region of the Russia in 1960. They were found with the Biarmosuchians Eotitanosuchus olsoni and Biarmosuchus tener in channel flood deposits of the young Ural Mountains. They differ in size, shape of the skull, and shape of the horns.

Originally all specimens were included in Estemmenosuchus uralensis, but it was since realised that there were a number of different species. However, not all palaeontologists agree that these were different species. According to Ivakhnenko (1998) Anoplosuchus and Zopherosuchus are synonyms of Estemmenosuchus uralensis.

Paleobiology

Thermoregulation
It has been suggested that the animal had a fairly constant internal temperature. Its large size and compact build gave a small surface-to-volume ratio and suggests it would not gain (or lose) temperature quickly. This phenomenon is called gigantothermy and was probably an important factor in temperature regulation in most therapsids.

Skin
P. Chudinov reported skin impressions belonging to Estemmenosuchus in 1968. The skin was described as being "glandular" like that of a hairless mammal or a frog.

References

Further reading
Chudinov, P. K. 1965, "New Facts about the Fauna of the Upper Permian of the USSR", Journal of Geology, 73:117-30
King, Gillian M., "Anomodontia" Part 17 C, Encyclopedia of Paleoherpetology, Gutsav Fischer Verlag, Stuttgart and New York, 1988
Olsen, E. C., 1962, Late Permian terrestrial vertebrates, USA and USSR Transactions of the American Philosophical Society, new series, 52:1–224
Patricia Vickers-Rich and Thomas H. Rich, The Great Russian Dinosaurs, Guntar Graphics, 1993, p. 30

External links 

 Palaeos - detailed description

Tapinocephalians
Prehistoric therapsid genera
Wordian genera
Guadalupian synapsids of Europe
Permian Russia
Fossils of Russia
Fossil taxa described in 1960